is the name given to the  of the Omotesenke line of the three Sen families/houses of Japanese tea ceremony, whose common family founder is Sen no Rikyū. The first in the line to use the hereditary name was Sen no Rikyū's great-grandson, known as Kōshin Sōsa (1613–1672), the third son of Sen no Sōtan, who inherited the main house in Kyoto from his father, Sōtan, and thus became the first generation in the line of the family that eventually came to be known as the Omotesenke ("front Sen house/family").

References

Bibliography
Daijirin, 2nd Ed.
Daijisen, 1st. Ed.
Kōjien, 5th Ed.

1613 births
1672 deaths